The Queen Mother Reservoir is a public water supply reservoir that lies between the M4 and the M25 to the west of London, close to Datchet. It is managed by Thames Water.

This is one of a number of reservoirs to the west of London and was completed in 1976. It was inaugurated on 9 July that year by Queen Elizabeth The Queen Mother, after whom it is named. Its water is pumped from the River Thames nearby. The water improves in quality during its retention in the reservoir as solids settle and organic contaminants are adsorbed and degraded through a combination of natural biological processes aided by sunlight and oxygenation. Water from the reservoir is treated (often using slow sand filters) before being put into supply as London tap water.  The reservoir contains a limnological tower.

During the design and early construction it was called the Datchet reservoir due to its closeness to the town.

Engineering design data for the Queen Mother reservoir is as follows.

The reservoir lies within the Colne Valley regional park and like other local reservoirs is popular for sailing and bird-watching. Petrels have been spotted at this reservoir.

See also
London water supply infrastructure

References

External links
Datchet Water Sailing Club

Reservoirs in Berkshire
Thames Water reservoirs
1976 establishments in England
Datchet
Drinking water reservoirs in England